Akste is a village in Põlva Parish, Põlva County in southern Estonia.

See also
Lake Akste

References

 

Villages in Põlva County